The Alabama Department of Youth Services (DYS) is a state agency of Alabama, headquartered on the grounds of the Mount Meigs Campus in Mount Meigs,and in Montgomery. The department operates juvenile correctional facilities.

The Alabama Department of Youth Services School District provides educational services to juveniles in DYS schools.

Facilities

Facilities directly operated by DYS include:
 Autauga Campus (unincorporated Autauga County, near Prattville)
 Mobile Group Home (Mobile)
 Mount Meigs Campus (Mount Meigs, unincorporated Montgomery County, near Montgomery), including since 2015:
 J. Walter Wood Treatment facility for girls.
 Thomasville Campus (unincorporated Clarke County)
 VACCA Campus (Roebuck, Birmingham)

 Closed
 Chalkville Campus (unincorporated Jefferson County, near Birmingham), for girls aged 12–18. Closed
 It ended operations after a tornado in January 2012.

References

External links

 

State agencies of Alabama
Penal system in Alabama
Juvenile detention centers in the United States
State corrections departments of the United States